Ernest Richard Eckett Sutton (1860 - 19 July 1946) FRIBA (also Richard Ernest Eckett Sutton) was an English architect based in Nottingham.

Career

He was born the son of Richard Charles Sutton and was articled to him in 1876. Later he was assistant to Alfred Waterhouse and then Sir Arthur William Blomfield. He started in independent practice in Nottingham in partnership with his father in 1895, and was then in partnership with Frederick William Charles Gregory from 1904 to 1914.

He was made a Fellow of the Royal Institute of British Architects on 9 January 1905. He was president of the Nottinghamshire Architectural Society from 1912-1913 and first president of the Nottinghamshire and Derbyshire Architectural Society from 1913-1914.

He died on 19 July 1946 and left an estate valued at £6610, to his son, Cecil Alfred Leonard Sutton.

Notable works

References

1859 births
1905 deaths
Architects from Nottingham
Fellows of the Royal Institute of British Architects